Winston Glacier is a glacier flowing to Winston Lagoon on the southeast side of Heard Island in the southern Indian Ocean. Its terminus is at Winston Lagoon, between Cape Lockyer and Oatt Rocks. To the northeast of Winston Glacier is Stephenson Glacier, the terminus of which is located between Dovers Moraine and Stephenson Lagoon. To the southwest of Winston Glacier is Fiftyone Glacier, whose terminus is located between Lavett Bluff and Lambeth Bluff.

Discovery and naming
Winston Glacier was surveyed by through the Australian National Antarctic Research Expeditions in 1948. It was named by Antarctic Names Committee of Australia in 1964 in association with nearby Winston Lagoon.

See also
List of glaciers in the Antarctic
Retreat of glaciers since 1850

References

Further reading

External links
Click here to see a map of Heard Island and McDonald Islands, including all major topographical features
Australian Antarctic Division
Australian Antarctic Gazetteer
Composite Gazetteer of Antarctica
Australian Antarctic Names and Medals Committee (AANMC)
United States Geological Survey, Geographic Names Information System (GNIS)
Scientific Committee on Antarctic Research (SCAR)

Glaciers of Heard Island and McDonald Islands